A series of attacks were perpetrated or ordered by Palestinian Arabs, some of them acting as suicide bombers, on Jewish targets in Jerusalem's Ben Yehuda Street from February 1948 onwards. The attacks took place before the declaration of the State of Israel's establishment in May 1948. Ben Yehuda Street was a major thoroughfare.

1948 (49-58 killed)

On February 22, 1948, three British Army trucks led by an armoured car driven by Arab irregulars and British deserters exploded on Ben Yehuda Street killing from 49 to 58 civilians and injuring from 140 to 200. The bomb may have been intended to kill members of the Furmans (Palmach convoy escorts) who lodged in the Atlantic and Amdursky Hotels but had left on patrol shortly beforehand. In addition to the two hotels, the Vilenchick Building and the Kupat-Milveh Bank were destroyed. The bomb had been created by Fawzi al-Qutb. The convoy was led by a Jerusalemite militant, 'Azmi al-Ja'uni, who spoke fluent English and could pass himself off as a British officer. Two British deserters, Eddie Brown, a police captain who claimed that the Irgun had killed his brother, and Peter Madison, an army corporal, had been persuaded to join the attack, also by the promise of substantial financial rewards.

Aftermath
A leaflet stating that the explosion was in response to an Irgun bomb attack three days earlier, in Ramla, on the 19th of February, was distributed the following evening. It was signed by Abd al-Qadir, who assumed responsibility for the operation. Abd al-Qadir himself, in Cairo the day after, left a statement to Al-Ahram to the same effect and the Army of the Holy War High Command reiterated the declaration in Palestine. Husayn al-Khalidi, secretary of the Arab Higher Committee, deplored the act as 'depravity unfit for the Arab spirit,' while the Committee itself, in an attempt to distance itself from the incident, tried to throw doubt on the authenticity of Abd al-Qadir's public statements.

In the ensuing confusion, Jewish residents immediately blamed the British for the attack. David Ben-Gurion, on visiting the site of the carnage, has been cited as putting some responsibility for this Arab attack on the shoulders of Jewish thugs, stating, "I could not forget that our thugs and murderers had opened the way." The Irgun spread word ordering militants to shoot on sight any Englishman. By day's end, eight British soldiers had been shot dead, while a ninth was murdered while laid up in a Jewish clinic for treatment of a wound. Lehi also reacted several days later by blowing up a train full of British soldiers as it drew out of Rehovot station, killing 27.

The day after, on 23 February, a Jewish offensive, deploying mortars, was launched against the Arab neighbourhood of Musrara, in Jerusalem, killing seven Arabs, including an entire family. The Arabs believed it was in revenge for the Ben-Yehuda Street bombing, though, according to Israeli historian Itamar Radai, at the time the Jews and their official institutions blamed only the British for the incident.

1971
September 8, 1971: A grenade was thrown into the entrance of Cafe Alno on Ben Yehuda Street. It did not explode and there were no injuries.

1974
December 12, 1974: An explosive device went off in Ben Yehuda Street. Thirteen people were injured lightly to moderately.

1975 (15 killed) 

On Friday, July 4, 1975, a refrigerator that had five kilograms of explosives packed into its sides exploded on Zion Square, a main city square connecting Ben Yehuda Street and Jaffa Road. Fifteen people were killed and 77 injured in the attack. Ahmad Jabara, who was responsible for placing the bomb, was arrested and sentenced to life and thirty years in prison, but was released by Israel in 2003 after serving 27 years as a gesture to Arafat, who then appointed him his adviser on prisoners affairs. He died in Ramallah in 2013.

On November 13, 1975, an explosive charge went off near Cafe Naveh on Jaffa Road, near the pedestrian mall. Seven people were killed and 45 injured.

1976
On April 9, 1976, a car bomb was dismantled on Ben Yehuda Street shortly before it was to have exploded.

On May 3, 1976, thirty-three passers-by were injured when a booby-trapped motor scooter exploded at the corner of Ben Yehuda and Ben Hillel Streets. Among those injured were the Greek consul in Jerusalem and his wife. The following day, on the eve of Independence Day, the municipality organized an event at the site of the attack, under the slogan "Nevertheless."

1979 (1 killed)
On January 1, 1979, a car bomb was found opposite Cafe Atara on the pedestrian mall and was neutralized about half an hour before it was to have blown up. 

On March 24, 1979, one person was killed and 13 people were injured when an explosive charge blew up in a trash can in Zion Square.

1981
On May 2, 1981, a police sapper was moderately injured by an explosive charge that had been placed in a trash can near Cafe Alno.

1984
On August 15, 1984, a car bomb was discovered on Ben Yehuda Street and defused about 10 minutes before it was to have exploded. In the car were about 12 kilograms of explosives and three kilograms of iron nails.

1997 (5 killed)

On September 4, 1997, three Hamas suicide bombers simultaneously blew themselves up on the pedestrian mall, killing five Israelis. The bombing was carried out by Palestinians from the village of Asira al-Shamaliya.

Three 14-year-old girls were killed in the attack: Sivann Zarka, Yael Botvin and Smadar Elhanan. Elhanan was the daughter of peace activist Nurit Peled-Elhanan and the granddaughter of Israeli general and politician Mattityahu Peled. 

The family of Yael Botvin, a U.S. citizen, filed a lawsuit in the United States against the Islamic Republic of Iran.

A default judgment of $251 million in compensatory and punitive damages was awarded to the relatives of Americans killed in the attack. There were few assets of the Iranian government in the United States following the judgment. The plaintiffs threatened to seize valuable Persian artifacts located in Chicago museums and sell them for proceeds, leading to the Chicago's Persian heritage crisis, as well as suing the account of the Bank Melli Iran in the Bank of New York, but having the United States Department of Justice speak as amicus curiae in support of Bank Melli, advising that the bank had no responsibility for turning the funds over, resulted in a ruling against the students.

2001 (11 killed)

On December 1, 2001, two suicide bombers detonated themselves on Ben Yehuda Street, followed by a car bomb set to go off as paramedics arrived. The suicide bombers killed eleven victims aged 15 to 21, including a number of soldiers out of uniform, and 188 were injured. Hamas claimed responsibility, stating that it was in retaliation for the killing of senior Hamas militant Mahmud Abu Hanoud. A Hamas spokesman in Gaza stated that these bombings did not assuage its lust for vengeance and that it would carry out further bombings. Lawsuits were filed against Arab Bank, NatWest and Crédit Lyonnais alleging that they channelled money to Hamas.

References

External links

Suicide bombing at the Ben-Yehuda pedestrian mall in Jerusalem - December 1, 2001
Mandate period
Ben Yehuda Street Bombing
 

Mass murder in 1948
Mass murder in 1975
Mass murder in 1997
Explosions in 1948
Mass murder in 2001
Terrorist incidents in Jerusalem
Suicide bombing in the Israeli–Palestinian conflict
Car and truck bombings in the Israeli–Palestinian conflict
Terrorist attacks attributed to Palestinian militant groups
Terrorist incidents in Asia in 1948
1948 in Mandatory Palestine
20th century in Jerusalem
Hamas suicide bombings
Terrorist incidents in Jerusalem in the 1990s
Terrorist incidents in Jerusalem in the 2000s
Terrorist incidents in Asia in 1975
Terrorist incidents in Asia in 1997
Terrorist incidents in Asia in 2001
1940s in Jerusalem
Terrorist incidents in Jerusalem in the 1970s